Alyce Louise Schlapp (November 30, 1912 – 1999) was an American politician and first female to be elected in the Massachusetts House of Representatives Fourth Essex District from 1943 to 1946. She campaigned to continue the works of her husband, representative Raymond Schlapp, while he was on military service.

References 

1999 deaths
1912 births
Members of the Massachusetts House of Representatives
Women state legislators in Massachusetts
20th-century American politicians
20th-century American women politicians